Milomir Minić (born 5 October 1950) is a Serbian professor, scientist and former politician who served as the prime minister of Serbia from 2000 to 2001.

Political career 
A member of the Socialist Party of Serbia, he was a close associate of Slobodan Milošević. He was the fifth prime minister of Serbia within the Federal Republic of Yugoslavia and ruled from 24 October 2000 to 25 January 2001.

Minić led a transitional government, which came into power a few weeks after the Overthrow of Slobodan Milošević, as a result of which then-prime minister Mirko Marjanović resigned on 21 October 2000.

His government was composed of Democratic Opposition of Serbia (DOS), Socialist Party of Serbia (SPS), and Serbian Renewal Movement (SPO) until extraordinary parliamentary elections were held on 23 December 2000.

References

1950 births
Living people
Politicians from Valjevo
Prime Ministers of Serbia
Socialist Party of Serbia politicians